Hanssuesia is a genus of pachycephalosaurid dinosaurs from the late Cretaceous period. It lived in what is now Alberta and Montana, and contains the single species Hanssuesia sternbergi.

Hanssuesia is based on a skull dome originally named Troodon sternbergi by Barnum Brown and Erich Maren Schlaikjer in 1943. The specific name honoured Charles Mortram Sternberg who found the dome in 1928 near Steveville in south Alberta. In 1945, it was transferred to Stegoceras by C.M. Sternberg himself, as a Stegoceras sternbergi.

The genus Hanssuesia was first named by Robert M. Sullivan in 2003. The generic name honours paleontologist Hans-Dieter Sues. The spelling variant "Hanssuessia" appeared in the publication, but the same year Sullivan chose for Hanssuesia as the valid name. Its type species is Troodon sternbergi, and the combinatio nova is Hanssuesia sternbergi.

H. sternbergi is known from the holotype NMC 8817 and six referred specimens (mainly frontoparietals) which were collected from two formations of the Belly River Group of Alberta, Canada, the Dinosaur Park Formation (late Campanian, 76.5–75 ma) in the Dinosaur Provincial Park, and the Oldman Formation (middle Campanian, 77.5-76.5 ma), as well as from the upper Judith River Formation of Montana, United States (late Campanian, 76–75 ma).

Like other pachycephalosaurs, Hanssuesia had a thick skull roof. However, Hanssuesia is distinguished from other pachycephalosaurs by having a depressed parietal region, a frontoparietal dome that is wide in front as well as in the rear, a broad nasal boss on the frontals, reduced but swollen prefrontal lobes, and a reduced parietosquamosal shelf at the dome rear. 

Hanssuesia was initially described as one of several pachycephalosaurids known from Dinosaur Park, including Stegoceras validum, Gravitholus albertae, and Foraminacephale brevis. It is unclear whether all of these species would have lived in the area at the same time. A 2023 publication by Dyer et al. found Gravitholus and Hanssuesia to be synonymous with Stegoceras, thus decreasing the diversity of Dinosaur Park pachcephalosaurids to only two valid taxa.

See also

 Timeline of pachycephalosaur research

References

Late Cretaceous dinosaurs of North America
Fossil taxa described in 2003
Pachycephalosaurs
Paleontology in Alberta
Paleontology in Montana
Campanian genus first appearances
Campanian genus extinctions
Ornithischian genera